A Duo Occasion is live performance DVD with Harry Connick Jr. on piano and Branford Marsalis on saxophone(s). Recorded at the Library and Archives Canada as part of the 25th anniversary of the Ottawa Jazz Festival on June 24, 2005.

The performance contains music from the album Occasion : Connick on Piano, Volume 2, except "Chattanooga Choo Choo" and "Light The Way".

Track listing

References

Branford Marsalis albums
Harry Connick Jr. video albums
2005 video albums
Collaborative albums
Live video albums
2005 live albums